Brian Kgosi Dolamo (born 30 November 1992) is a South African soccer player currently playing as a midfielder for TTM.

Club career
Born in Johannesburg, South Africa, Dolamo started his career with Jomo Cosmos, Mamelodi Sundowns and Kaizer Chiefs, before trialling with Swedish side Djurgården. In 2017, he moved to Spain to sign for Villaviciosa de Odón.

On his return to South Africa he signed for TTM, and scored his first goal for the club in a 2–1 Nedbank Cup win over Cape Town Spurs.

Career statistics

Club

Notes

References

1992 births
Living people
Sportspeople from Johannesburg
South African soccer players
Association football midfielders
National First Division players
Jomo Cosmos F.C. players
Mamelodi Sundowns F.C. players
Kaizer Chiefs F.C. players
Polokwane City F.C. players
Tshakhuma Tsha Madzivhandila F.C. players
South African expatriate soccer players
South African expatriate sportspeople in Spain
Expatriate footballers in Spain